"Death Is the Only Answer" is a special mini-episode of the British science fiction television series Doctor Who that was first broadcast on BBC Three (as part of Doctor Who Confidential) on 1 October 2011. It was written via a "Script to Screen" competition in which junior schools were asked to write a script including the Eleventh Doctor and an enemy of his. The competition was won by the children of Oakley CE Junior School.

In the mini-episode, the Doctor's fez calls its former owner Albert Einstein (Nickolas Grace) into the TARDIS. Einstein carries a mysterious liquid which changes Einstein into an Ood.

Plot
The episode opens with the Doctor in the TARDIS reunited with his fez from "The Big Bang". While reminiscing happily about it he trips over, knocking the fez off his head and hitting a lever on the console. The fez vanishes and then Albert Einstein appears with the fez on his head. Einstein greets the Doctor and explains that he had been working on a time machine and thought he'd found the vital part of it — a mysterious liquid which Einstein believes to be "bionic fusion liquid".

The Doctor offers to run some tests on it but Einstein insists upon testing it himself and turns to walk away from the console. However, the liquid spits up at his face and changes Einstein into an Ood. For several seconds the "Albert-Ood" repeats "Death is the Only Answer", confusing the Doctor. Suddenly a white cylinder vortex appears and the "Albert-Ood" walks towards it and somehow manages to turn back into Einstein. Einstein asks to go home so the Doctor drops him off in 1945 ("18th of September, about two o'clock").  The Doctor leaves for another adventure, while a bit of the liquid is left on the floor, moving slowly.

Production

Writing

"Death Is the Only Answer" is the winner of BBC Learning's "Script to Screen" writing competition, which began on 28 April 2011 and encouraged children aged 9 to 11 to collaborate on a three-minute script for the Eleventh Doctor. The script also could feature a new human character and an enemy of an Ood, Judoon, Cyberman, or Weeping Angel. BBC Learning's website contained learning resources for teachers and pupils to exercise their writing skills, while Matt Smith, Karen Gillan and Arthur Darvill presented a series of videos in character as the Doctor, Amy Pond and Rory Williams respectively. Videos were also produced with advice about how to write a good script and incorporating character and stage directions. Response to the competition was great, with 292,000 downloads of the online teaching material.

The children's teacher, Kevin Downing, had told all the upper school children about the competition at an assembly, asking them to come up with a good plot in small groups. He said that they spent "about three hours over a number of weeks writing the script. Being Doctor Who fans, they had great fun deliberating over how the Doctor would react to things, what he would say and imagining how it would look on screen. None of us ever imagined the school would win the competition of course, but it was exciting to have entered and have the finished script to look back on in years to come."

The chosen script was written by four pupils from Oakley CE Junior School: Adam Shephard, Ben Weston, Daniel Heaton, and Katie Hossick. They chose an Ood to feature in the mini-episode after deciding that the Cybermen "walk a bit too slowly", the Judoon are "not really scary", and a Weeping Angel "wouldn't really do anything". The appearance of Albert Einstein came about because the pupils had learned about him at school.

Selection and filming
The winners were selected by showrunner Steven Moffat, BBC Learning controller Saul Nassé, and Doctor Who executive producers Piers Wenger and Beth Willis. Of the judging, Moffat said,

Matt Smith was impressed with the chosen script, and particularly Albert Einstein's role in the mini-episode. Smith, who had also written his own stories about Einstein meeting the Doctor, said that the story was "brilliantly realised. They [the children] did it with aplomb."

The winners were taken to the Upper Boat Studios complex near Cardiff in Wales to see their episode being filmed, while the Doctor Who Confidential team was there to document the transition from script to screen.

Broadcast
"Death Is the Only Answer" was aired in the finale of Doctor Who Confidential on 1 October 2011; previous episodes had detailed the transformation from script to screen.

References

External links

2011 British television episodes
Eleventh Doctor episodes
Cultural depictions of Albert Einstein
Doctor Who mini-episodes